Winganon is an unincorporated community in northern Rogers County, Oklahoma, United States. It is located on U.S. Route 75 one mile east of Oologah Lake and approximately seven miles west of Chelsea.

Space capsule cement mixer
A cement truck rolled over on the side of the road.  The company that owned it came and got the truck, but left the mixer behind because it held tons of concrete.  No one is sure exactly when the wreck happened. Some accounts put it in the early 1970s, some in the late 1960s and others as far back as 1959.  It is located on Winganon Road between Highway 169 and Oologah Lake in Rogers County.  In 2008, Heather Thomas and her husband, Barry, and some friends came up with the idea to celebrate their 5th anniversary by using canning lids, garden hose, and other household items to make the cement mixer look like a space capsule.

References

Unincorporated communities in Rogers County, Oklahoma
Unincorporated communities in Oklahoma